Johanna Maria Stephanie Claes-Vetter (February 25, 1884 – October 9, 1974) was a Dutch-born novelist in Belgium who wrote in Dutch.

She was born Johanna Maria Stephanie Vetter in Zutphen and married Flemish writer Ernest Claes. Vetter was an advocate for women's rights in Flanders. From 1909 to 1914, she was co-editor of the women's literary magazine De Lelie. She published her first novel Eer de mail sluit (Before the mail closes) in 1915. In 1927, a collection of short stories Verholen krachten (Hidden forces) was published.

She died in Elsene at the age of 90.

Selected works 
 Als de dagen lengen (When the days lengthen) (1940)
 Haar eigen weg (Her own way) (1944)
 Martine - een ontgoocheling (Martine - a disappointment) (1954)
 Angst (1960)

References 

1884 births
1974 deaths
Belgian women novelists
Dutch-language writers
People from Zutphen
20th-century Belgian novelists
20th-century Belgian women writers
20th-century Dutch novelists
20th-century Dutch women writers
Dutch women novelists
Dutch emigrants to Belgium